(born 1988) is a Japanese speed skater. He competed at the 2010 Winter Olympics in Vancouver. He won a silver medal in 5000 metre relay at the 2011 Asian Winter Games.

Personal life
Takamido was born in Ichinomiya, Aichi Prefecture, on 11 January 1988.

References

External links
 Yuzo Takamido at ISU

1988 births
Living people
Japanese male short track speed skaters
Olympic short track speed skaters of Japan
Short track speed skaters at the 2010 Winter Olympics
Short track speed skaters at the 2014 Winter Olympics
Asian Games medalists in short track speed skating
Asian Games silver medalists for Japan
Short track speed skaters at the 2011 Asian Winter Games
Medalists at the 2011 Asian Winter Games
Sportspeople from Aichi Prefecture